Hamrlík is a Czech surname. Notable people with the surname include:

Martin Hamrlík (born 1973), Czech ice hockey player
Roman Hamrlík (born 1974), Czech ice hockey player, brother of Martin

Czech-language surnames